National Bang Bang Cook Cook is a South Korea reality show program on MBN starring Cha Tae-hyun, Jang Hyuk, Lee Sang-yeob, Ahn Jung-hwan, Hyun Joo-yup, Kim Tae-kyun, Park Tae-hwan. The show airs on MBN every Saturday at 18:00 (KST) from April 10, 2021 to June 26, 2021.

Synopsis 
This show is an outdoor cooking competition where the cast members will compete among their teams. Each week they will be given a different theme to serve the guests.

Fixed Cast

Guests

Ratings 
 Ratings listed below are the individual corner ratings of National Bang Bang Cook Cook. (Note: Individual corner ratings do not include commercial time, which regular ratings include.)

References

External links 
 Official website 

South Korean reality television series
South Korean television shows
2021 South Korean television series debuts
Korean-language television shows